Vrbnica is a village and municipality in Michalovce District in the Kosice Region of eastern Slovakia.

History
In historical records the village was first mentioned in 1330.

Geography
The village lies at an altitude of 105 metres and covers an area of 4.945 km².
It has a population of about 805 people.

Ethnicity
The population is about 90% Slovak and 10% Gipsy in ethnicity.

Culture
The village has a small public library, and a football pitch.

Economy
The village has a food store, and a small doctors surgery.

The nearest railway station is 2 kilometres away at Hatalov.

External links
Official website of the municipality
https://web.archive.org/web/20080111223415/http://www.statistics.sk/mosmis/eng/run.html 

Villages and municipalities in Michalovce District
Zemplín (region)